The Copa América Femenina (Copa América Feminina in Portuguese), previously the Campeonato Sudamericano de Fútbol Femenino (Campeonato Sul-Americano de Futebol Feminino), usually shortened to Sudamericano Femenino (Sul-Americano Feminino), is the main competition in women's association football for national teams that are affiliated with CONMEBOL. It is the women's version of the Copa América.

It was first held in 1991. In the first two editions of the tournament, only one team (the champions) qualified for the FIFA Women's World Cup. In the third edition, the champions qualified automatically, while the runners-up faced a team from the CONCACAF region in a play-off match to earn a spot in the World Cup. In the fourth, fifth and sixth editions, two automatic spots were given to the top two teams for the 2003, 2007 and 2011 World Cups respectively.

In December 2020, CONMEBOL announced the tournament would be held every two years instead of every four years, starting in 2022.

There are also Under-20 and Under-17 versions of this tournament.

Results

Notes

Top Four classifications
So far, only Bolivia has not yet reached a top four position in the tournament.

General statistics

Participating nations
Legend
 – Champions
 – Runners-up
 – Third place
 – Fourth place
5th – Fifth place
6th – Sixth place
7th – Seventh place
8th – Eighth place
9th – Ninth place
10th – Tenth place
Q – Qualified
—  Did Not Participate
 — Hosts

Top scorers

References

External links

 
 South-American Women's Championship by José Luis Pierrend at RSSSF

 
CONMEBOL competitions for women's national teams
Recurring sporting events established in 1991
1991 establishments in South America